The West End & Atlanta Street Railroad Company of Atlanta, Georgia was organized in 1872 by Thomas Alexander, M. G. Dobbins, B. J. Wilson, Benjamin H. Broomhead, Alvin K. Seago, J. M. Alexander, James Atkins, J. W. Goldsmith, John M. Harwell and Jonathan Norcross. The horsecar route started downtown and went via West End Avenue and Ashby Street (now Abernathy) to West End and Westview Cemetery.

See also
Streetcars in Atlanta
Timeline of mass transit in Atlanta

References

 Atlanta's Streetcars of the Nineteenth Century (blog)
 Acts generated by the General Assembly of Georgia, p.374

History of Atlanta
Defunct public transport operators in the United States
Companies based in Atlanta
Railway lines in Atlanta